The 2015 Maryland Terrapins football team represented the University of Maryland, College Park in the 2015 NCAA Division I FBS football season. The Terrapins were led by fifth-year head coach Randy Edsall, who was fired after starting the season 2–4. Offensive coordinator Mike Locksley was promoted to interim head coach for the remainder of the season. They played their home games at Byrd Stadium. They finished the season 3–9, 1–7 in Big Ten play to finish in last place in the East Division.

Previous season
The 2014 Maryland Terrapins football team finished the regular season 7-5, with a highlight win against Indiana the team's first Big Ten Conference win. After defeating the Penn State Nittany Lions the Terrapins become bowl eligible and was invited to play in the 2014 Foster Farms Bowl against the Stanford Cardinal of the Pac-12 Conference. Maryland lost to the Cardinal in Santa Clara, California 21–45 finishing their 2014 Season at 7-6.

Schedule
Maryland announced their 2015 football schedule on June 3, 2013. The 2015 schedule consisted of 6 home, 5 away, and 1 neutral site games in the regular season. The Terrapins hosted Big Ten foes Indiana, Michigan, and Wisconsin and traveled to Iowa, Michigan State, the defending champions Ohio State, and Rutgers. Maryland played Penn State in Baltimore at the M&T Bank Stadium for the 39th meeting of their rivalry

The Terrapins hosted three of their four non conference games against Bowling Green, Richmond and South Florida (USF). Maryland traveled to Morgantown, West Virginia to face rival West Virginia of the Big 12 Conference on September 26.

Schedule Source:

Roster

References

Maryland
Maryland Terrapins football seasons
Maryland Terrapins football